Clarisse Garcia (born December 18, 1984) is an American basketball coach who is currently the head coach of the women's basketball team at Charleston Southern University.

Playing career 
Garcia played basketball at Villanova from 2003 to 2007, where she was a walk-on player. During her time at Villanova, she was a three-time member of the dean's list, as well as a three-time Big East All-Academic member.

Coaching career 
Garcia began her coaching career as a graduate assistant at Seton Hill University in Pennsylvania, before moving on to Stetson in 2009 as an assistant coach.

Garcia was named the head coach at Palm Beach Atlantic University, a Division II school in Florida in May 2010. She compiled a 15–39 record in two seasons before she stepped down to take an assistant coaching position at Alabama in 2012. She spent one season at Alabama before joining Wake Forest as an assistant. She was also an assistant coach at Auburn from 2016 to 2021.

Garcia was named the head coach at Charleston Southern on May 3, 2021.

Head coaching record

References

External links 
 
 Charleston Southern Buccaneers profile

1984 births
Living people
People from Wheat Ridge, Colorado
People from Aliquippa, Pennsylvania
Basketball players from Colorado
Basketball players from Pennsylvania
Basketball coaches from Colorado
Basketball coaches from Pennsylvania
Guards (basketball)
Villanova Wildcats women's basketball players
Seton Hill Griffins women's basketball coaches
Stetson Hatters women's basketball coaches
Palm Beach Atlantic Sailfish women's basketball coaches
Alabama Crimson Tide women's basketball coaches
Wake Forest Demon Deacons women's basketball coaches
Auburn Tigers women's basketball coaches
Charleston Southern Buccaneers women's basketball coaches